11020 Orwell, provisional designation , is a background asteroid from the outer regions of the asteroid belt, approximately 14 kilometers in diameter. It was discovered on 31 July 1984, by Czech astronomer Antonín Mrkos at Kleť Observatory in the Czech Republic. The asteroid was named after English writer George Orwell.

Classification and orbit 

Orwell orbits the Sun in the outer main-belt at a distance of 2.6–3.6 AU once every 5 years and 6 months (1,993 days). Its orbit has an eccentricity of 0.15 and an inclination of 3° with respect to the ecliptic.

Physical characteristics 

According to the survey carried out by NASA's Wide-field Infrared Survey Explorer with its subsequent NEOWISE mission, Orwell measures 14.466 kilometers in diameter and its surface has an albedo of 0.089. It has an absolute magnitude of 12.6.

Lightcurves 

As of 2017, Orwells spectral type, as well as its rotation period and shape remain unknown.

Naming 

This minor planet was named for British writer Eric Blair (1903–1950), better known by his pen name George Orwell, who is associated with the year of the object's discovery, 1984, due to his dystopian novel Nineteen Eighty-Four, which explores the dangers of totalitarian rule. He is also known for the novel Animal Farm. The name was proposed by Czech astronomer Jana Tichá at Klet and supported by Brian G. Marsden. The approved naming citation was published by the Minor Planet Center on 23 May 2000.

References

External links 
  Kleť Observatory & KLENOT Project homepage
 Asteroid Lightcurve Database (LCDB), query form (info )
 Dictionary of Minor Planet Names, Google books
 Asteroids and comets rotation curves, CdR – Observatoire de Genève, Raoul Behrend
 Discovery Circumstances: Numbered Minor Planets (10001)-(15000) – Minor Planet Center
 
 

011020
Discoveries by Antonín Mrkos
Named minor planets
George Orwell
19840731